Vila Mariana is a station on Line 1 (Blue) of the São Paulo Metro.

SPTrans 
Passengers may access the following SPTrans routes from the station:

References

São Paulo Metro stations
Railway stations opened in 1974
1974 establishments in Brazil
Railway stations located underground in Brazil